Aardsma is a Dutch surname. Notable people with the surname include:

Betsy Aardsma (1947–1969), famous unsolved murder victim
David Aardsma (born 1981), American baseball player

Dutch-language surnames